Let Me Play With Your Poodle may refer to:
 "Let Me Play With Your Poodle" (song), a 1942 hokum blues song by Tampa Red
 Let Me Play With Your Poodle (album), a 1997 blues album by Marcia Ball